Ahmad ibn Ibrahim ibn Ali ibn Munim al-Abdari (died 1228), often referred to as ibn Munim, was a mathematician, originally from Dénia in Andalusia. He lived and taught in Marrakesh where he was known as one of the best scholars in geometry and number theory. He is often confused with Muhammad ibn 'Abd al Mun'im, a different mathematician who worked in the court of Roger II of Sicily.

Only three of his many mathematical texts are known today; one on magic squares, one on geometry and one on the science of calculation. Only the last, Fiqh al-hisab is extant. It is the first book in the history of mathematics to devote a whole chapter to combinatorial problems.

References

Year of birth unknown
1228 deaths
Medieval Moroccan mathematicians
13th-century mathematicians
Moroccan writers
13th-century Moroccan people
People from Marrakesh